Subtropical Storm Nicole was the first subtropical storm to receive a name using the standard hurricane name list that did not become a tropical cyclone. The fifteenth tropical or subtropical cyclone and fourteenth named storm of the 2004 Atlantic hurricane season, Nicole developed on October 10 near Bermuda from a broad surface low that developed as a result of the interaction between an upper level trough and a decaying cold front. Deep convection developed near the center of the system as it attempted to become a fully tropical cyclone. However, it failed to do so and was absorbed by an extratropical cyclone late on October 11.

Nicole dropped moderate amounts of rainfall in Bermuda, while rough seas caused problems for cruise lines. In Canada, the remnants of the storm combined with an extratropical storm to produce strong winds and heavy rainfall, which caused damage to trees and power lines. The remnant storm also produced gale-force winds across New England, while swells from the storm provided welcome surf conditions along the East Coast of the United States.

Meteorological history

An upper-level trough and a decaying cold front persisted across the western Atlantic Ocean in early October. The interaction between the two led to the formation of an area of low pressure on October 8 to the southwest of Bermuda. The system lacked a single well-defined circulation, though it possessed gale-force winds as it moved northwestward. The system gradually became better organized, and though there were no signs of tropical development on October 9, computer models suggested a subtropical storm could form. On October 10, a well-defined low-level circulation developed as a band of clouds formed in the northern portion of the system.

The first National Hurricane Center forecast on Nicole noted the development of convection over the western portion of the center, and that if the trend continued, transitioning into a tropical cyclone would be possible. Shortly after passing Bermuda, Nicole developed persistent deep convection near the center, while Advanced Microwave Sounding Unit overpasses indicated the potential of a warm core within the system. Though Nicole attempted to acquire tropical characteristics, strong upper-level wind shear prevented the transition. Late on October 11, the circulation of Nicole became indistinguishable from the larger extratropical cyclone, and advisories on the system were discontinued at 18:00 UTC as Nicole was absorbed by the extratropical cyclone.

Preparations, impact, and naming

On October 9, one day prior to the storm's formation, the Bermuda Weather Service issued a gale warning for the island. The agency also issued a Tropical Storm Watch shortly after the storm developed. All warnings were canceled after the storm passed the island. Thunderstorms were also reported on the island. Poor weather conditions from Nicole forced the cancellation of several events at the tourist-driven Bermuda Music Festival, including acts by Isaac Hayes, Gerald Albright, and Anita Baker. Strong winds knocked down power lines, leaving over 1,800 homes and businesses without power. Unsettled conditions also resulted in airport delays. High winds delayed or altered the courses of four cruise ships.

The Canadian Hurricane Centre issued seven bulletins on the storm, though the system only briefly entered the centre's response zone before it dissipated. Due to moisture from Nicole combined with the extratropical storm, the Atlantic Storm Prediction Centre issued heavy rainfall and wind warnings for large portions of the Canadian Maritimes. The remnants of Nicole combined with a powerful extratropical cyclone to produce strong winds across the Maritimes. Winds gusted to hurricane-force on western Cape Breton, with the strongest gusts reaching . The strong winds uprooted trees and downed power lines and combined with rough seas to cause cancellations for ferry crossings and restricted access to the Confederation Bridge. The storm's passage during the middle of apple harvest caused troubles for Annapolis Valley.

In Maine, the winds snapped branches off trees, and also downed trees and power lines. Power outages were reported, primarily in coastal portions of Washington and Hancock Counties. Nicole produced moderate swells along the East Coast of the United States. Conditions for surfing were best in New York and Rhode Island, where swells of over  occurred. Eleven ships reported tropical storm force winds in association with Subtropical Storm Nicole. The maximum recorded wind was  while the storm was at peak intensity, while the minimum recorded pressure was 995 mbar as Nicole was being absorbed by the extratropical storm.

Since 2002, subtropical storms have been assigned names from the predetermined list of names used for tropical cyclones. Nicole was the first named subtropical storm since the policy change that did not become a fully tropical cyclone. Hurricane Gustav in 2002 formed as and was named as a subtropical cyclone, although it later became a fully tropical cyclone and later strengthened into a hurricane. In 1972 and 1973, four subtropical storms were named using the Phonetic alphabet. All other subtropical cyclones remained unnamed.

See also

 Other storms of the same name
 List of Atlantic hurricanes
 List of Bermuda hurricanes
 List of United States hurricanes
 Hurricane Grace (1991)
 Hurricane Nate (2005)

References

External links

NHC's public advisory archive on Subtropical Storm Nicole.
 NHC 2004 Tropical Cyclone Archive
 Effects of the Third-Quarter Hurricanes on Income Measures

Nicole
Nicole (2004)
Nicole (2004)
Nicole (2004)
Nicole